John Spaulding may refer to:

 John Spaulding (poet), American poet
 John Spaulding (Vermont Treasurer)
 John Spaulding (artist) (1942–2004), American artist

See also
 John Spalding (disambiguation)